The Innocents Society is the Chancellor's senior honorary society at the University of Nebraska-Lincoln, composed of 13 men and women who apply during the spring of their junior year and are selected on the basis of academic excellence, unparalleled leadership, and selfless service to the University and community.  Members are known throughout campus, but the society still retains secrecy through rituals and a secret meeting room. Members work to promote school spirit and create an appreciation among the student body of the greater values for which Nebraska stands.

Founding
The society was founded on April 24, 1903, through the efforts of notable University of Nebraska alumni, including George Condra and Roscoe Pound, a famous legal scholar who would later become dean at Harvard Law School.  Pound and Condra drew on medieval customs of knighthood, as well as papal traditions, in forming the ritual and heraldry of the society.  They named the society for the 13 Popes named Innocent, who have historically stood as champions against evil.  The Mephistopheles head represents the evil the society seeks to overcome.

History

During their early years, the Innocents Society selected the UNL cheerleaders, supervised an annual Olympics between the freshmen and sophomores, and planned Dandelion Day and Fete Day. Another tradition that started was that of the Victory Bell exchange. A bell was stolen from a Seward, Neb. church in 1892 by members of Delta Tau Delta and Phi Delta Theta fraternities. For years, the fraternities competed in athletic and scholastic competitions for possession of the bell. However, in 1926 it was suggested that an award for the winner of the Nebraska-Missouri football game be established. It was decided that the bell be awarded to the winner, and it was engraved with a "M" on one side and an "N" on the other. The bell tradition ceased with the University of Nebraska's entrance to the Big Ten Conference, making the 106th class of the Innocents Society the last to trade (and keep) the oldest trophy in collegiate football. In 2011, 107th class of the Innocents Society began a new trophy exchange with the University of Iowa.

During the '40s and '50s, the Innocents coordinated freshmen beanie sales and would wear identical jackets one day each week. Like the Missouri bell exchange, at this time an exchange with the University of Colorado was coordinated. The head of a buffalo was mounted for a mere $20 and named 'Mr. Chips'. Mr. Chips was then given to the winner of the annual Nebraska vs. Colorado football game. Unfortunately, in 1962 Mr. Chips somehow got misplaced by members of Colorado's Heart and Dagger Society, and the tradition was not continued. The Innocents of these years were quite the mischievous group, but many of these antics died down during the '70s. The '80s brought renewed spirit to the Innocents, and although the Innocents today no longer coordinate Dandelion Day or choose members of the spirit squad, they still carry on many of the traditions set forth by their founders.  The Innocents of 2005-2006 sponsored a fundraiser for a local nonprofit organization, raising $10,000.  The Innocents of 2007-2008 continued this philanthropic tradition by raising more than $14,000 for a local domestic abuse shelter.

Currently

The 2008-2009 Innocents coordinated iVan (Innocents Volunteer Across Nebraska), a service trip across the state of Nebraska. The 104th Class of Innocents went on the road, stopping at 13 towns over the course of four days and completed a service project in each town.  The service projects included painting rooms at an alcohol rehabilitation center, park beautification, presenting to students about the importance of serving the community, canned food drives, litter pick up, and assisting with the restoration of a town auditorium. 

This tradition has been carried on since the 104th class, marking a new annual tradition for the Innocents Society.

Notable alumni
Herbert Brownell Jr. - former United States Attorney General 
Howard Buffett - former U.S. Congressman 
Jon Bruning - former Nebraska Attorney General 
Robert Kerrey - former Governor and United States Senator 
Ralph Knobel - former State Republican Party Chairman 
James Milliken - former University of Nebraska President 
Adam Morfeld - Current Nebraska State Senator
Larry D. Johnson - former United Nations Assistant Secretary General of Legal Affairs 
Norbert T. Tiemann - former Nebraska Governor 
Bill Thornton - Former Nebraska Cornhuskers football player and coach, former St. Louis Football Cardinals player and coach.  First African-American member of the Society of Innocents.
Kyle Vanden Bosch - former Detroit Lions Defensive End 
Don Wesely - former Lincoln Mayor and Nebraska State Senator 
John Wirtz - Hudl cofounder

External links
Innocents Society Website
University of Nebraska Official Website

References

University of Nebraska–Lincoln
Collegiate secret societies
Student societies in the United States
Student organizations established in 1903
1903 establishments in Nebraska